The Anti-Zionist Committee of the Soviet Public (Antisionistsky komitet sovyetskoy obshchestvennosti; abbreviated AZCSP ) was a body formed in 1983 in the Soviet Union as an anti-Zionist propaganda tool. Formation of AZCSP was approved on 29 March 1983 by the Secretariat of the Central Committee of the Communist Party of the Soviet Union in resolution 101/62ГС: "Support the proposition of the Department of Propaganda of the Central Committee and the KGB USSR about the creation of the Anti-Zionist Committee of the Soviet Public..."

Anti-Zionist manifesto 
On 1 April 1983, the CPSU official newspaper, Pravda, ran a full front-page article titled From the Soviet Leadership:
 "...By its nature, Zionism concentrates ultra-nationalism, chauvinism and racial intolerance, excuse for territorial occupation and annexation, military opportunism, cult of political promiscuousness and irresponsibility, demagogy and ideological diversion, dirty tactics and perfidy... Absurd are attempts of Zionist ideologists to present those who criticize them, or condemn the aggressive politics of Israel's ruling circles, as antisemitic... We call on all Soviet citizens: workers, peasants, representatives of intelligentsia: take active part in exposing Zionism, strongly rebuke its endeavors; social scientists: activate scientific research to criticize the reactionary core of that ideology and aggressive character of its political practice; writers, artists, journalists: to more fully expose the anti-populace and anti-humane diversionary character of the propaganda and politics of Zionism..." (highlights preserved)

The fundamental idea of the anti-Zionist manifesto was that potential Jewish emigrants from the Soviet Union were to be considered enemies of the Soviet Union. The anti-Zionist manifesto was signed by 8 anti-Zionist Jews:
David Abramovich Dragunsky, Colonel-General, twice the Hero of the Soviet Union
Samuel Zivs, law professor 
Genrikh Gofman
Yuri Kolesnikov 
Martin Kabachnik, Lenin Prize winner 
Gregory Bondarevsky, history professor 
Boris Sheinin, filmmaker 
Henrikas Zimanos, philosopher

Background and history 
From late 1944, Joseph Stalin adopted a pro-Zionist foreign policy, apparently believing that the new country would be socialist and would speed the decline of British influence in the Middle East. Accordingly, in November 1947, the Soviet Union, together with the other Soviet bloc countries, voted in favor of the United Nations Partition Plan for Palestine, which paved the way for the creation of the State of Israel. On May 17, 1948, three days after Israel declared its independence, the Soviet Union officially granted de jure recognition of Israel, becoming only the second country to recognise the Jewish state (preceded only by the United States' de facto recognition) and the first country to grant Israel de jure recognition.

By 1983, the Soviet regime needed a new propaganda weapon in the Cold War, as well as against an increasingly active internal dissident movement, to arrest or discredit the mass emigration of Soviet Jews and to alleviate the Arab concerns about its effects on Israel's demographics. By the dramatic stepping-up of "anti-Zionist" activities, the AZSCP was designed to solve these problems.

David Abramovich Dragunsky, Colonel-General, twice Hero of the Soviet Union and World War II hero (he was the commander of the 55th Guards Tank Brigade), well known inside the country and abroad, was designated its chairman.

The writers who specialized in the Soviet-invented and sponsored doctrine of Zionology ("сионология") considered any expressions of Jewishness as Zionist and therefore subject to being stamped out. In November 1975, the leading Soviet historian academic M. Korostovtsev wrote a letter to the Secretary of the Central Committee, Mikhail Suslov, regarding the book The encroaching counterrevolution by prominent Zionologist Vladimir Begun: "...it perceptibly stirs up anti-Semitism under the flag of anti-Zionism".

In addition to propaganda in the mass media and publishing, the AZCSP's projects included the "International symposium on contemporary problems of anti-Zionism" and preparation for an "International anti-Zionist congress".

By the end of the 1980s, with the new policies of glasnost and perestroika, and with the impending dissolution of the Soviet Union, the old Soviet regime had lost its stability and many of those plans had to be cancelled. Finally it was dismantled in October 1994.

Some materials produced by the AZCSP were used by ultra-nationalist groups such as Pamyat.

List of members 
 David Dragunsky, chairman – Colonel-General, Hero of the Soviet Union (twice)
 S.L. Zivs, v.c. – doctor of jurisprudence
 M. B. Krupkin, v.c. – vice-chairman of Agenstvo Pechati Novosti (APN) publishing house, director of department of Literaturnaya Gazeta
 Elina Bystritskaya, actress
 I. P. Belyayev – doctor of economics
 Yury A. Kolesnikov – writer
 M. I. Kabachnik – academician, Hero of Socialist Labor
 Teodor Oizerman – philosopher and academician
 V. N. Kudryavtsev – member of the Academy of sciences of the USSR
 Matvey Blanter – composer, Hero of Socialist Labor
 Angelina Stepanova – artist, Hero of Socialist Labor
 Tatyana Lioznova – film director, the State Award nominee
 B. S. Sheinin – cinematographer
 A. K. Marinich – director of a kolkhoz, Hero of Socialist Labor
 G. B. Gofman – writer, Hero of the Soviet Union
 Caesar Solodar – writer
 Aron Vergelis – poet
 G. O. Zimanas – professor
 Yakov Fishman – chief rabbi of Moscow (died a few months after the creation of the committee)
 Adolf Shayevich – the chief rabbi of Moscow (declared on 1989-01-01 that he was no longer a member)
and others.

See also
Anti-Semitism
Anti-Zionism
History of the Jews in Russia and Soviet Union
Soviet Anti-Zionism
Refusenik
Jackson–Vanik amendment
Jewish Anti-Fascist Committee
Doctors' plot
Rootless cosmopolitan
Yevsektsiya

References

 Russian Antisemitism, Pamyat and the Demonology of Zionism (Studies in Antisemitism) by William Korey
Robert O. Freedman, The Politics of Anti-Semitism and Emigration and the Dynamics of Resettlement, Duke University Press, 1989

Anti-Zionism in the Soviet Union
Jews and Judaism in the Soviet Union
Soviet propaganda organizations
Israel–Soviet Union relations
1983 establishments in the Soviet Union